is a passenger railway station located in Kita-ku, the city of Saitama, Saitama Prefecture, Japan, operated by the East Japan Railway Company (JR East).

Lines
Miyahara Station is served by the Takasaki Line, with through Shōnan-Shinjuku Line and Ueno-Tokyo Line services to and from the Tōkaidō Main Line.

Layout
The station has two island platforms serving four tracks, connected by a footbridge, with an elevated station building located above the platforms. The station is staffed.

Platforms

History 
Miyahara Station was opened on 15 July 1948. The station became part of the JR East network after the privatization of the JNR on 1 April 1987.

Passenger statistics
In fiscal 2019, the station was used by an average of 24,337 passengers daily (boarding passengers only).

Surrounding area
 
Miyahara Post Office
former Nakasendo highway
Seigakuin University

See also
List of railway stations in Japan

Gallery

References

External links

JR East Miyahara Station

Railway stations in Saitama Prefecture
Railway stations in Japan opened in 1948
Takasaki Line
Stations of East Japan Railway Company
Railway stations in Saitama (city)
Shōnan-Shinjuku Line